Corpus Christi College is a private, co-educational, Catholic, College, located in Bateman, a southern suburb of Perth, Western Australia.

Established in 1983, the College has a non-selective enrolment policy and currently caters for approximately 1,755 students from Kindergarten to Year 12. The majority of students attending the college are drawn from the local parishes of Bateman, Willetton, Applecross, Winthrop, Riverton and Canning Vale.

History
Corpus Christi College was officially opened as a co-educational Catholic College for secondary students by the Archbishop of Perth, Sir Lancelot Goody, and the Commonwealth Minister for Finance, John Dawkins, on 17 April 1983. It was established as the first non-order owned co-educational Catholic Secondary College in the Archdiocese of Perth by the Catholic Education Commission. From its opening it had 128 Year 8 students and 7 teaching staff which has since grown into its present numbers of 1755 students from Kindergarten to Year 12, after amalgamating with Yidarra Catholic Primary School on 1 January 2022.

The school has produced one Rhodes scholar: Travers McLeod (2007).

Campus
Corpus Christi College is situated on a single, seven hectare campus, located in suburban Bateman.
 
The current facilities of the College include: a Theatre; Education Support Centre; chapel; library; science laboratories; an auditorium with associated music and drama facilities; computer laboratories; specialist rooms for art, craft, food technology, fabrics and textiles, materials technology, technical graphics and information communication technology; a gymnasium; oval; playing fields; year 7 block; multipurpose hall; hard courts.

Officially opened in August 2019, the Caroline Payne Theatre caters to the needs of drama, dance and music disciplines, while also being suitable for assemblies and presentations. 

The College is currently in the process of building an Aquatic Centre. The centre will feature a covered and heated 25m, eight-lane indoor lap and water polo pool, a separate 12m learn-to-swim pool, and terrace seating for 180 people. Construction commenced in November 2019, with the project slated for completion at the end of 2020.

House system
As with most Australian schools, Corpus utilises a house system. As of 2011, there are eight houses:

Notable alumni

Emma Biss - Western Fury and Perth Scorchers cricketer
Simon Black - Brisbane Lions Football Club player, 2002 Brownlow Medalist
Josh Carr - Port Adelaide Football Club player
Matthew Carr - Retired footballer, brother of Josh
Karina Carvalho - Australian journalist
Charmaine Dragun - Co-anchor for Channel 10 news team 2003-2007
Garrick Ibbotson - Fremantle Football Club player
Andrija Jukic - Perth Glory Football Club player
Minjee Lee - Professional and Olympic golfer (also attended Methodist Ladies' College, Perth)
Chris Masten - West Coast Eagles player
Shaun McManus - Retired Fremantle Football Club player and radio breakfast show host on Nova 93.7 from Monday to Friday
Ross O'Donovan - Animator, voice actor, and co-host of Steam Train
Chris Piechocki - actor, Reef Doctors, Ms Fisher's Murder Mysteries
Rove McManus - Host of Rove Live, owner of production company Roving Enterprises, multi Gold Logie Award winner
Jaeger O'Meara - Hawthorn Hawks player

See also
Education in Australia
List of schools in the Perth metropolitan area
Public and private education in Australia
Roman Catholic Church in Australia

References

Educational institutions established in 1983
Catholic secondary schools in Perth, Western Australia
1983 establishments in Australia